Aikaterini Kontochristopoulou (born 10 June 1997) is a Greek fencer. She competed in the women's foil event at the 2016 Summer Olympics. She was defeated in the round of 64 by Do Thi Anh of Vietnam and did not advance.

References

External links
 
 

1997 births
Living people
Greek female foil fencers
Olympic fencers of Greece
Fencers at the 2016 Summer Olympics
Place of birth missing (living people)
Fencers at the 2014 Summer Youth Olympics
European Games competitors for Greece
Fencers at the 2015 European Games
Sportspeople from Attica
21st-century Greek women